Ossie Brown is an American former Negro league pitcher who played in the 1930s.

Brown made his Negro leagues debut in 1935 with the Chicago American Giants and played for Chicago again the following season. He went on to play for the St. Louis–New Orleans Stars in 1939.

References

External links
 and Baseball-Reference Black Baseball stats and Seamheads

Year of birth missing
Place of birth missing
Possibly living people
Chicago American Giants players
St. Louis–New Orleans Stars players
Baseball pitchers